The  was an electric locomotive formerly operated in Japan from 1926 until 1960. The Class ED15 was the first mainline electric locomotive type to be built domestically in Japan.

History
Three locomotives were built by Hitachi in Mito, Ibaraki, in 1926, based on electric locomotives previously imported from overseas. Initially designated Class 1070 under the original Japanese Government Railways (JGR) numbering scheme, the locomotives became Class ED15 from 1928.

The locomotives were initially used on Tokaido Main Line freight services, and were later employed on the Chuo Main Line.

The locomotives were withdrawn from service between 1959 and 1960.

Preservation 
ED15 1 is preserved at the Hitachi Mito Factory in Hitachinaka, Ibaraki.

Classification

The ED15 classification for this locomotive type is explained below.
 E: Electric locomotive
 D: Four driving axles
 15: Locomotive with maximum speed 85 km/h or less

See also
Mechanical Engineering Heritage (Japan), No. 45: Type ED15 Electric Locomotive.

References

Electric locomotives of Japan
1500 V DC locomotives
1067 mm gauge locomotives of Japan
Railway locomotives introduced in 1926
Hitachi locomotives